This is a list of monuments in Xagħra, Gozo Malta, which are listed on the National Inventory of the Cultural Property of the Maltese Islands.

List 

|}

Notes

References

Xaghra
Xagħra